Grime is the third studio album by Danish death metal band Iniquity, released in 2001

Track listing
 "Tides of Vengeance" (Fagerlind/Haarlov) - 4:31 
 "The Bullet's Breath" (Haarlov) - 3:53 
 "Border Into Shadow" (Haarlov/Fagerlind) - 5:40 
 "Bloodletting" (Meier) - 5:29
 "Spawn of the Abscess" (Meier/Haarlov) - 7:23
 "Thawed for Breeding" (Fagerlind/Haarlov) - 6:16
 "Stygian" (Instrumental) - 0:38
 "The Last Incantation" (Fagerlind) - 5:14
 "Poets of the Trench" (Haarlov/Fagerlind) - 2:54
 "Poets of the Trench, Part II" (Fagerlind) - 3:57

Credits
Jesper Frost Jensen - drums 
Mads Haarløv - vocals, Guitar
Thomas Fagerlind - Bass 
Kræn Meier - Guitar
Jacob Hansen - Producer, Engineer, Mixing
Bjarke Ahlstrand - Executive Producer, Editing, Mastering, Photography, Typography, Visuals
Michael H. Andersen - Executive Producer
Ossian Ryner - Editing
Daniel Long - Artwork, Collage

2001 albums
Iniquity (band) albums
Albums produced by Jacob Hansen